Quintus Aelius Tubero ( 17–11 BC) was a Roman senator. He was one of the priestly  who oversaw the celebration of the Saecular Games in 17 BC. He held the office of consul in 11 BC with Paullus Fabius Maximus. Rüpke and Glock date his appointment to the college of priests about 21 BC.

He was a son of Quintus Aelius Tubero, the jurist and historian, and a daughter of the jurist Servius Sulpicius Rufus. His brother was Sextus Aelius Catus, consul in AD 4. The family was raised to patrician rank by the emperor Augustus. He was also maternal uncle of the jurist Gaius Cassius Longinus, and probably a paternal cousin (according to Sumner) of the notorious Lucius Aelius Sejanus. Tubero was also probably an uncle of Aelia Paetina, wife of the emperor Claudius.

References 

 
 
 

1st-century BC Roman consuls
Tubero, Quintus
Priests of the Roman Empire
Quindecimviri sacris faciundis
Roman patricians
Year of birth unknown
Year of death unknown